Mohamed El-Amin Ahmed El-Tom is a Sudanese mathematician and the first minister of education after the Sudanese Revolution, serving between 2019 and 2022.

Early life and education 
Mohamed El-Amin Ahmed El-Tom was born in October 1941. He completed a bachelor of science degree in Mathematics from the University of Leeds with first class honours in 1965. This was followed by a Diploma in Advanced Mathematics from the University of Oxford in 1966 taking courses on Numerical Analysis, Functional Analysis, Group Theory, and Commutative Algebra. He then completed a doctor of philosophy (DPhil) in 1969 supervised by David Christopher Handscomb.

Academic career 
After his bachelor's, El-Tom became a Junior Scholar at the University of Khartoum (1962-65). After his DPhil, he returned as a Senior Scholar between 1965-68, where he helped establish the Mathematical Sciences School, before becoming a Research Fellow at the Center de Calcul, University of Louvain, Belgium (1968-69).
 
El-Tom later became a Lecturer at the University of Ulster, and a Professor at the Columbia University. He also worked at European Center for Nuclear Research (CERN), Qatar University, and Sudan Centre for Educational Research. He then became the Dean of the University of Garden City.

Research 
El-Tom has published over 50 papers on integration convergence, approximations, and interpolation. His work also focuses on the state and future of mathematics education and mathematical research in Sudan, Islamic countries, Africa, and North America.
 
El-Tom chaired and organised the International Conference on Developing Mathematics in Third World Countries, in Khartoum, in March 1978, and The Status and Future of Higher Education in Sudan, in Cairo, in 1998. He also was one of the founders of the African Institute for Mathematical Sciences, Dar es Salaam in 2003.

Minister of Education 
After the Sudanese Revolution, the Sudanese Teachers Committee and the Northern Entity Alliance, one of the components of the Revolutionary Front, nominated El-Tom for the Ministry of Education, due to his “deep patriotism, professionalism and high efficiency". and because “there is no person more qualified than him". On 5 September 2019, he was nominated Minister of Education.

Reforms 
El-Tom fought within the Council of Ministers for raising education from the ninth to second position in the pyramid of government spending priorities, which were presented by the former Minister of Finance in charge of the Council. He also insisted on implementing the slogan of free education. 
He provided through donors an amount of $2 for each student per year. If a school had 1,000 students, it would receive $2,000 to provide for its needs, without burdening the citizens. He tried to oblige the government and donors to provide school meals. El-Tom enacted a new Public Education Law and the Private Education Law in 2020.
 
El-Tom introduced an e-learning management system, linking all schools throughout Sudan, the ministry, and the parents of students. Further he started to implement the system from Darfur to be circulated throughout Sudan. El-Tom was also able to provide virtual training for hundreds of teachers by Sudanese companies, organisations and volunteers from abroad, who initially provided training in the English language and developed a plan for training in mathematics. The Ministry of Education also authorised a regulation banning corporal punishment in educational institutions.

El-Tom proposed giving the students of the College of Education a stipend while studying to raise the acceptance rate for the Colleges of Education, to guarantee the graduation of qualified teachers. He is credited with improving the status of the teacher, by raising the salary of  a new graduate from 3,000 pounds to more than 16,000 pounds per month.  El-Tom had the idea of constructing exemplary schools, in terms of buildings and content, called the Twenty-First Century Skills Schools, and found funding for them from abroad, and Sudanese engineers who would implement them.

The new curriculum controversy 
El-Tom stressed that his ministry had taken practical steps to reform the educational system in the country and lay solid foundations for quality and free education for all by 2030. Regarding the curricula and their changes, El-Tom believes that the general trend, regardless of the subject, is to take into account the student's age and the readiness of his mind to absorb the material. As for what is said about reducing the number of surahs of the Qur’an prescribed at a certain stage and the controversy that arises regarding them, El-Tom explained that choosing a surah for a six-year-old, for example, must be done based on certain goals and his ability to memorise and understand them without effort. This was enshrined by the National Center for Educational Curricula, Training, Guidance and Research, led by Omar Al-Qurai, which revised and developed elementary school curricula from grade one to grade six in 2020.

A fierce battle ensued involving politicians, clerics, and journalists over proposals to change the school curricula, led by the Director of Curricula at the Ministry of Education, Omar Al-Qarai. At the same time, education experts and activists opposed them. The debate began after a proposal for a new history book for the sixth grade was leaked. In particular the painting The Creation of Adam by Renaissance artist Michelangelo sparked controversy, as it was asserted to be heretical. Social media witnessed several duels and debates between Sudanese about the curricula, as well as the creation of accounts and pages that attack or support Omar Al-Qarai personally. The crisis was exacerbated by the circulation of a video clip of the imam of the mosque, Muhammad Al-Amin Ismail, crying on the Friday's Khutbah, regretting what was stated in the new curricula, before attacking Al-Qarai fiercely.
 
The head of the Sudan Liberation Movement/Army, Minni Minnawi, tweeted that the campaign led by some imams does not stem from motives to preserve religion, but rather was a political campaign aimed at obstructing change that begins with the educational curricula. The political secretary of the Justice and Equality Movement, Suleiman Sandal, stated in press statements that "a school curriculum will not be taught to our children that contains images that embody God while we are in the government". The leader of the National Umma Party, Abd al-Rahman al-Ghali, incited the government to dismiss al-Qarai pointing to Al-Qari's intellectual and political background as a member of the Republican Brotherhood, whose founder, Mahmoud Mohammed Taha, was executed in 1985 on charges of apostasy.
 
The educational expert, Mubarak Yahya, head of the Sudanese Coalition for Education for All, criticised the regression of the curricula issue to the political arena and the quarrels that it entailed. He said that the curricula required a national conference to ensure proper construction of them at a high professional level and great societal values ​​and advice, far from politics. However a member of the Central Council of the Sudanese Gathering of the Teachers Committee, Ammar Yusef, believes that there is a campaign against Al-Qari behind which supporters of the former regime stand. He pointed out that the Teachers' Committee did not participate in developing the new curricula.
 
Omar al-Qurai blamed the Minister of Religious Affairs and Endowments, Nasr al-Din Mufreh, for his silence even when some clerics called for his death. Al-Qari had insisted that he would not step down unless a decision was taken to cancel the curricula in response to pressure. However,  Al-Qarai resigned soon afterwards on 7 January 2021.
 
The Sudanese Teachers Committee affirmed that there would be no turning back from the project of radical change in the education system that was initiated by the Ministry of Education, and great strides were made in it.
 
Prime Minister Abdallah Hamdouk formed a national committee to review the curricula, to submit its report after two weeks. The committee also ensures that the new curriculum adheres to professional and national standards, and that it is teachable.

Other hurdles and achievements 
In March 2020, the Sudanese Ministry of Education decided to postpone secondary school exams, which were scheduled for the next 12 April, for an indefinite period, to be determined later, after the dangers of the Coronavirus had cleared. El-Tom said in a press conference that "the decision was taken in the interest of the students and their families", expressing his apology for the issuance of the emergency decision, despite the preparations being made for the exams, which affected about 500,000 students.
 
In August 2020, El-Tom argued against closing schools due to the pandemic as many students would quit school and start working in markets, and a large part of the student body would forget previous lessons. However, he conceded to the Health Emergency Committee. But in September 2020, the Ministry of Education announced the postponement of the opening of schools, scheduled for the 27th of this month, to 22 November due to the lack of readiness of a large proportion of schools in various states of Sudan, due to the catastrophic floods, torrents and rains that struck large parts of the country.
 
In November 2020, the World Bank Board of Directors approved an education project supported by a $61.5 million grant to support preparatory Education in Sudan to maintain and improve basic education for children, with significant support for teachers, schools and communities. The project will also enhance the government's ability to formulate policies and monitor progress across the education system. The Global Partnership provides this grant for Education, which constitutes the largest funding to support basic Education in Sudan to date. The project will cover all public schools, prioritising investment in disadvantaged and marginalised areas. In early 2020, the Global Partnership for Education provided an $11 million grant to support Sudan in strengthening programs to respond to the country's education needs in light of the COVID-19 pandemic.
 
In November 2020, as part of an initiative to give 50,000 out-of-school children access to high-quality formal and informal education, the Education Above All (EAA) Foundation and its partner UNICEF signed a Memorandum of Understanding (MoU) with the Federal Ministry of Education of Sudan. According to a statement from EAA, the project will put a special emphasis on enhancing learning environments and building capacity to ensure that children who are deprived of education receive a quality education, as well as increasing community involvement and raising awareness of the value of access to and enrollment in primary education.

Formation of new government 
On 8 February 2021, Sudanese Prime Minister Abdallah Hamdouk issued a decision to relieve the ministers of the transitional government from their posts in preparation of a new government formation. The statement added that the ministers would continue in their positions as caretakers until the formation of the new government and the completion of handover procedures once the Transitional Sovereignty Council had announced the formation of the new government. The statement indicated that the new formation would not include the name of a minister of education, as consultations were still taking place regarding this ministry.
 
El-Tom was excluded from the new cabinet's nomination list by the prime minister Abdalla Hamdouk, who submitted the list to the Supreme Council under the pretext that El-Tom had failed a 'security check'. The Sudanese Teachers Committee protested. El-Tom considered his exclusion from the ministry through security check a disgrace to his reputation, which caused him psychological harm, and added, “This is a serious accusation!”. El-Tom told Al-Ekhbari: “I am now an accused citizen, and those accusing me must prove whether I am an agent, or have I committed a crime, or been involved in corruption, or what?” He stressed that state officials cannot launch such (empty) words. He revealed that, after requests to restore confidence in him, he had received a flood of calls to inquire as to what crime he could have committed, which could have caused him to be excluded from the ministry.
 
The Teachers Committee - the most prominent component of the Sudanese Professionals Association - announced its rejection of the partisan quota of the ministry, and adhered to Minister El-Tom. In May 2021 and after two months of the post being vacant, a memorandum calling on the Prime Minister to name El-Tom as Minister of Education was signed by a group of civil society organisations, university professors and intellectuals. The memorandum also demanded the approval of the laws drawn up by the competent committees to reform education including the Public Education Law of 2020, the Private Education Law of 2020, and the Law of the National Center for Educational Curricula, Training, Guidance and Research 2020.
 
In April 2021, the Ministry of Education denied the resignation of El-Tom contrary to what was being circulated on social media. However, on 26 August 2021, El-Tom announced that he had written his resignation letter and submitted it to the Sudanese Prime Minister after Hamdouk's direct interference in his duties as a minister when Hamdouk froze the new curriculum, after it had been approved by the Minister of Education.
 
Afterwards, Hamdouk demanded that each book of the textbooks be carefully reviewed by authors, language specialists and designers, including illustrators and makers of pictures, provided that the draft of the book be sent to reviewers specialised in the subject of each book for scientific review before sending it to the printing press, provided that no book was printed before its scientific approval by three rectifiers. The Prime Minister called for introducing the concept of national education within the contents of school subjects in the different grades of the primary stage, provided that a subject be singled out for it in the intermediate and secondary stages, and among its topics would be time management. Hamdouk called for the rewriting of the history book for the sixth grade and the preservation of the surahs of memorisation in the Holy Qur’an completely without deleting any of the verses and keeping all the units and lessons that were deleted from the mathematics textbooks for the second, third, fourth and fifth grades with deleting the first unit (groups) and the fifth unit (operations).
 
Hamdouk then met, in his office, delegations that included Islamic and Christian clerics in the presence of the Minister of Religious Affairs, Nasr al-Din Mufreh, to talk about the initiative to review and reconsider the curriculum that was developed during the period of Omar Al-Qurai at the head of the National Curriculum Center.

Personal life 
El-Tom is married with three children.

Awards and honours 
El-Tom was elected a Fellow of the Institute of Mathematics and its Applications in 1978, a Fellow of the African Academy of Sciences in 1986, and a Fellow of Sudanese National Academy of Sciences in 2007.
 
El-Tom was a member of the International Centre for Theoretical Physics, Trieste, Italy, between 1984 and 1989, and is a member of the Arab Thought Forum, Jordan since 1985, the Mathematical Association of America, USA since 1992, the American Mathematical Society, USA since 1995, and the Sudanese Academics since 1998.
 
El-Tom was elected Sudan’s personality of the year by Al Khatim Adlan Center for Enlightenment and Human Development (KACE).
 
In response to an invitation from the Global Science Program at Uppsala University, El-Tom participated in attending the 2013 Nobel Prize event in Stockholm. Prizes were distributed in physics, chemistry, economics and literature. In 2022, he was invited to the Nobel Prize awarding ceremony.

References

External links 
 Interview with Professor Mohamed El Amin El-Tom, in Arabic by Sudan Bukra

Fellows of the African Academy of Sciences

1941 births

Living people
Ulster University
Columbia University faculty
Alumni of the University of Leeds
Alumni of the University of Oxford
Sudanese mathematicians
Sudanese politicians
Fellows of the Sudanese National Academy of Sciences